Vijayalakshmi is an Indian actress who has predominantly appeared in Kannada and Tamil films. In 1997, she won Filmfare Award for Best Actress in Kannada for her performance in her debut Kannada film Nagamandala as Rani.

Birth
Vijayalakshmi was born in Chennai and did her studies in Bengaluru, Karnataka. She has a sister named Usha.

Career
Vijayalakshmi acted in nearly 40 films in her career. She has acted in nearly 25 Kannada films. During her stint as an actress, she was recognized for her beauty and performance. She debuted in director T. S. Nagabharana's film Nagamandala, based on a folk tale, opposite Prakash Raj. She acted in the Tamil films Friends along with Vijay and Suriya. She returned to the Tamil film industry again with the comedy film Boss Engira Bhaskaran, which became one of 2010's biggest successes. In Telugu, she was recognized in the film Hanuman Junction. She has also acted in one Malayalam film with Mohanlal 'Devadoothan'

Television
She has also acted in quite a few Tamil television serials. She also was an anchor of the game show Bangarada Bete, produced by Radaan Media Works.

Personal life
Vijayalakshmi has been residing in Chennai since few year. In 2006, it was reported that Vijayalakshmi attempted suicide by overdosing on sleeping pills after being harassed by an assistant director  who wanted to marry her. The decision came at the end of a difficult year for her in which her father also had died, but she survived and recovered thereafter. However, in November 2006, she announced her engagement to actor Srujan Lokesh, with the wedding pencilled in for March 2007, after three years of dating. In a turn of events, the engagement was broken off.

Vijayalakshmi filed a complaint in February 2020 accusing Seeman of cheating her after being in a relationship with her and claimed that he had not married her despite making promises.

After being allegedly harassed by Seeman and his supporters, she attempted suicide again in July 2020 by overdosing on blood pressure tablets and was admitted to hospital. It has been confirmed by High Courts that the accusation was false.

Partial filmography

Television
Serials

Shows

References

External links
 

Indian people of Sri Lankan descent
Actresses in Kannada cinema
Tamil actresses
Living people
Indian film actresses
Actresses from Chennai
Indian television actresses
Actresses in Tamil cinema
20th-century Indian actresses
21st-century Indian actresses
Actresses in Telugu cinema
People of Sri Lankan Tamil descent
Actresses in Tamil television
1980 births